Anomomorpha tuberculata is a species of lichen in the family Graphidaceae. Found in southern Costa Rica, it was described as new to science in 2011.

References

Lichen species
Lichens described in 2011
Lichens of Central America
Graphidaceae
Taxa named by Robert Lücking